Indianapolis Weed and Seed is the name of a federal crime control/prevention initiative that serves several Indianapolis neighborhoods. The organization was founded by the city of Indianapolis in the 1990s as a way to address the crime issues that plague inner-city areas. In recent years the Weed and Seed foundation was expanded to cities all over the country, including Broward County, FL.

See also 
Community Capacity Development Office
Haughville
Riverside, Indianapolis

External links 

 Weed and Seed Homepage

Crime in Indianapolis
Organizations based in Indianapolis